In physics, a charged particle is a particle with an electric charge. It may be an ion, such as a molecule or atom with a surplus or deficit of electrons relative to protons. It can also be an electron or a proton, or another elementary particle, which are all believed to have the same charge (except antimatter). Another charged particle may be an atomic nucleus devoid of electrons, such as an alpha particle.

A plasma is a collection of charged particles, atomic nuclei and separated electrons, but can also be a gas containing a significant proportion of charged particles.

Charges are arbitrarily labeled as positive(+) or negative(-). Only the existence of two 'types' of charges is known, there isn't anything inherent about positive charges that makes them positive, and the same goes for the negative charge.

Examples

Positively charged particles 
 protons and atomic nuclei
 positrons (antielectrons)
 alpha particles
 positive charged pions
 cations

Negatively charged particles 
 electrons
 antiprotons
 muons
 tauons
 negative charged pions
 anions

Particles without an electric charge
 neutrons
 photons
 neutrinos
 neutral pions
z boson 
higgs boson
atoms

References

External links
 Charged particle motion in E/B Field

Charge carriers
Particle physics